Marijan Budimir (born 19 October 1980 in Split) is a Croatian retired football defender, currently the coach of Hajduk Split's U19 team.

References

External links

1980 births
Living people
Footballers from Split, Croatia
Association football defenders
Croatian footballers
NK Celje players
FK Vėtra players
NK Inter Zaprešić players
NK Karlovac players
Slovenian PrvaLiga players
A Lyga players
Croatian Football League players
Croatian expatriate footballers
Expatriate footballers in Italy
Croatian expatriate sportspeople in Italy
Expatriate footballers in Slovenia
Croatian expatriate sportspeople in Slovenia
Expatriate footballers in Lithuania
Croatian expatriate sportspeople in Lithuania
HNK Hajduk Split non-playing staff